Matija Muhar (born 22 July 1996) is a Slovenian track and field athlete who competes in the javelin throw. He won a gold medal at the World U18 Championships in 2013.

References

External links

1996 births
Living people
Slovenian male javelin throwers